is a Japanese professional wrestler currently working as a freelancer and is best known for his tenure with the Japanese promotion DDT Pro-Wrestling and Kaientai Dojo.

Professional wrestling career

Independent circuit (2002–present)
As a freelancer, he is known for working with various promotions. At the 5th Anniversary of NEO Women's Pro Wrestling on May 5, 2005, Nira took part in one of the longest matches in professional wrestling history, a 55-person battle royal in which he competed against notable opponents such as the winner Kyoko Inoue, Yuki Miyazaki, Kayoko Haruyama, Tetsuhiro Kuroda, Command Bolshoi and many others. On the second night of the Differ Cup 2005 of Pro Wrestling Noah, Nira teamed up with Stalker Ichikawa and got defeated by Awesome Kong in a 2-on-1 handicap match. At AJPW/RO&D RO&D Festival, an event promoted by All Japan Pro Wrestling on September 11, 2005, Nira teamed up with Kikutaro and Eggman in a losing effort to Voodoo Murders (Chuck Palumbo, Johnny Stamboli and Taru) as a result of a six-man tag team match.

Kaientai Dojo (2002–2017)
Nira made his professional wrestling debut on April 20, 2002, at K-DOJO First Impression, an event promoted by Kaientai Dojo where he teamed up with Apple Miyuki and Maya to unsuccessfully challenge Psycho in a 3-on-1 handicap match. At K-DOJO Club-K Free on November 3, 2004, he competed in a 28-man battle royal to determine the #1 contender for the Strongest-K Championship also involving Gentaro, Hi69, Taka Michinoku, Quiet Storm and others.

DDT Pro-Wrestling (2004–present)
Nira is best known for his tenure with DDT Pro-Wrestling. He often wrestled in unusual matches such as the 34-person tag team match from DDT New Year's Gift Special 2015 where he teamed up with sixteen tag partners among which were Daisuke Sasaki, Kota Ibushi, Michael Nakazawa, Saki Akai and Super Sasadango Machine to defeat the likes of Makoto Oishi, Shuji Ishikawa, Konosuke Takeshita, Sanshiro Takagi and Shigehiro Irie. Another special match in which he worked was a drinking match at BJW/DDT/K-DOJO Sapporo Pro-Wrestling Festa 2013, a cross-over event produced by DDT in partnership with Kaientai Dojo and Big Japan Pro Wrestling on October 14 where he teamed up with Ryuji Ito to beat Masa Takanashi and Ryuichi Sekine.

He worked in many of the promotion's signature events. One of them is DDT Peter Pan, branch of events in which he wrestled most of the times in Rumble rules matches for the Ironman Heavymetalweight Championship. He made his first appearance at Peter Pan 2009 from August 23 where he competed in this kind of match also involving Toru Owashi, Giru Nakano, Yumiko Hotta, Riho and others. Two years later at Ryōgoku Peter Pan 2011 on July 24, Nira competed in another rumble rules match again involving notable opponents such as Yuzuki Aikawa, Tsuyoshi Kikuchi, Emi Sakura and Cherry. At Budokan Peter Pan on August 18, 2012, Nira defended the Ironman Heavymetalweight Championship in the rumble match unsuccessfully in front of the winner Yoshiaki Fujiwara, Mio Shirai, Tomomitsu Matsunaga, Ken Ohka and others.

As for the DDT Judgement branch of events, Nira made his first appearance at Judgement 2009 on April 5, 2009, where he firstly defeated Mammoth Handa and Yoshiaki Yago in a three-way match to qualify in a #1 Conterdership Double Chance Battle Royal with a contract suspended above the ring to challenge for the KO-D Openweight Championship, match which also involved the winner Harashima, Daisuke Sekimoto, Poison Sawada Julie, Kazuhiro Tamura and others. At Judgement 2016: DDT 19th Anniversary on March 21, 2016, Nira teamed up with Dai Suzuki defeating Seiya Morohashi and Hoshitango. Morohashi was the King of Dark Champion but Nira did not take the title off him due to the "loss meaning successful defense" of the title rule.

Championships and accomplishments
DDT Pro-Wrestling
Ironman Heavymetalweight Championship (11 times)
Gatoh Move Pro Wrestling
IWA Triple Crown Championship (1 time)

References

External links 
 

Living people
Japanese male professional wrestlers
People from Niigata Prefecture
Year of birth missing (living people)
21st-century professional wrestlers
Ironman Heavymetalweight Champions